The Shadow Between may refer to:

 The Shadow Between (1920 film), a British silent crime film
 The Shadow Between (1931 film), a British romantic drama film